Mon Repos Conservation Park is a national park containing an important turtle rookery located at Mon Repos, Bundaberg Region, Queensland, Australia,  east of Bundaberg. Mon Repos hosts the largest concentration of nesting marine turtles on the eastern Australian mainland and supports the most significant nesting population of the endangered loggerhead turtle in the South Pacific Ocean. Successful breeding here is critical if the loggerhead species is to survive. In far smaller numbers the flatback and green turtles and, intermittently, the leatherback turtle also nest along the Bundaberg coast.

From November to March each year, adult turtles come ashore to lay eggs on Mon Repos beach. About eight weeks later young turtles emerge from the eggs and begin their journey to the sea. The best time to see turtles nesting is after dark from mid-November to February. Hatchlings usually leave their nests at night from mid-January until late March.

Queensland Parks and Wildlife Service rangers operate guided tours nightly during the breeding season. Mon Repos is a popular tourist attraction, with around 25,000 visitors every season. Beach access is now managed during the season to ensure that the impact of humans on nesting sea turtles is minimal.

Mon Repos is French for "My Rest" and was the name of the homestead established by Augustus Purling Barton in 1884. Barton was a pioneer of the Queensland sugar industry. 

The area was owned by the French Government between 1890 and 1925 after they had laid the first telegraph cable from Australia to New Caledonia. The cable came ashore on Mon Repos beach.

Trivia
A turtle conservation movie used at this centre was actually filmed in Ballina, New South Wales approx 7 hours drive from Bundaberg. It was filmed in the Serpentine River and the turtle was released by the local wild bird rescue man just south of Shaws Bay.

See also

 Protected areas of Queensland

References

External links
 Mon Repos Conservation Park
Mon Repos Plantation John Oxley Library Blog, State Library of Queensland.
Mon Repos Turtle Centre 

Conservation parks of Queensland
Parks in Bundaberg
Tourist attractions in Bundaberg